Ylva Persson (born 30 March 1960) is a Swedish former freestyle swimmer. She competed in two events at the 1976 Summer Olympics.

References

External links
 

1960 births
Living people
Swedish female freestyle swimmers
Olympic swimmers of Sweden
Swimmers at the 1976 Summer Olympics
Swimmers from Stockholm
20th-century Swedish women